Manju Vyas known by her stage name, Ishita Vyas is an Indian television and film actress. She placed in the top seven of the reality television show, Kingfisher Calendar Hunt 2013.

Career
Vyas began her career as a model then she moved on to acting. Her first project was the talk show Lift Kara De for Yash Raj Films. Soon after the show went on air, she got a chance to play Jhalkaribai, an Indian female Koli soldier who played an important role in the Indian Rebellion of 1857 for the serial Jhansi Ki Rani. Her portrayal of Jhalkaribai led to widespread acclaim in both Bollywood and the television industry. She also played in a film for Kamdhenu Steel with John Matthew Matthan. After seeing Ishita's talent, financer and producer Apoorvaditya (Aaditya) Kulshreshtha signed him up for his big-budget suspense thriller film named 11.40, which will start shooting in August 2020.

Filmography

Television

Films

References

External links

Living people
Actresses from Madhya Pradesh
People from Hoshangabad
21st-century Indian actresses
Female models from Madhya Pradesh
Actresses in Hindi cinema
Indian film actresses
Actresses in Hindi television
Actresses in Telugu cinema
Actresses in Kannada cinema
Indian television actresses
Year of birth missing (living people)